The 1983 Campeonato Brasileiro Série B, officially, the Taça de Prata 1983, was the 6th edition of the Campeonato Brasileiro Série B.

Rules
The championship had the same format than in 1982, being performed by 48 teams.in the first phase, 36 teams, divided into 6 groups of 6 teams each, in which the two best teams of each group proceeded to the second phase, in which the twelve teams were divided into four groups of three teams.the first placed team of each group were promoted to the Second phase of the Taça de Ouro of the same year. the second placed teams of each group would proceed to the Third phase, in which they would be joined by the twelve clubs that hadn't qualified to the Second phase in the Taça de Ouro.the Third phase was disputed in a knockout tournament format, and the winners qualified to the Quarterfinals, with the knockout tournament continuing until two teams reached the finals.those were promoted to the Copa Brasil of the following year. However, the rules for the 1984 championship were eventually changed, with Juventus and CSA losing their berths in the 1984 Copa Brasil in favour of Vasco da Gama and Grêmio, that, due to their records in the 1983 state championships, wouldn't have qualified for the 1984 Campeonato Brasileiro normally.

First phase

Group A

Group B

Group C

Group D

Group E

Group F

Second phase

Group G

Group H

Group I

Group J

Third phase

|}

Quarterfinals

|}

Semifinals

|}

Finals

First leg

Second leg

Replay

References

Sources
 RSSSF

Campeonato Brasileiro Série B seasons
B